Ethel Grandin (March 3, 1894 – September 28, 1988) was an American silent film actress.

Grandin was born in New York City. She was married to Ray C. Smallwood from 1912 until his death on February 23, 1964; they had a son named Arthur Smallwood. She began her acting career on stage appearing with Joseph Jefferson in Rip Van Winkle. She made her last film appearance in 1922. She died in Woodland Hills, California, of natural causes at age 94.

Partial filmography
 Behind the Times (1911)
 War on the Plains (1912)
 The Deserter (1912)
 The Invaders (1912)
 When Lincoln Paid (1913)
 Traffic in Souls (1913)
 The Crimson Stain Mystery (1916)
 Garments of Truth (1921)
 The Hunch (1921)
 A Tailor-Made Man (1922)

References

External links

 

Ethel Grandin  at Women Film Pioneers Project

1894 births
1988 deaths
American silent film actresses
American stage actresses
Actresses from New York City
People from Greater Los Angeles
20th-century American actresses
Women film pioneers